Keina Tito is a former First Lady of the Republic of Kiribati and a noted advocate for the preservation of indigenous I-Kiribati traditions.

Tito is the wife of Teburoro Tito, who was President of Kiribati from 1994 to 2003. During that time, Keina Tito accompanied her husband at official functions, where she delivered addresses on the topic of cultural preservation. At a Micronesian sub-regional meeting in March 2000, she called upon women in particular to maintain "the good aspects of our traditions and cultures that have held us together peacefully for hundreds of years, and which are now being threatened to extinction by the sweeping tides of global economic, social and political change." The meeting was on the occasion of celebrations of the International Women's Day, and the theme, supported by the presidential couple, was "Women for the maintenance and enhancement of our culture and peace".

Keina Tito had previously co-authored a chapter on "Tradition: Ancient Gilbertese Society" in the book Kiribati: Aspects of History, a compendium of articles on I-Kiribati history by I-Kiribati academics.

References

Living people
Year of birth missing (living people)
First ladies of Kiribati
I-Kiribati women writers
I-Kiribati writers